Tom Ropelewski is an American screenwriter, producer and director. He is best known for films Look Who's Talking Now, Loverboy, The Next Best Thing and The Kiss.

He is married to screenwriter/producer, Leslie Dixon.

In May 2006, The Hollywood Reporter reported that Ropelewski and Evan Katz were hired to write the script for an action film entitled Game Boys for Walt Disney Pictures and Jerry Bruckheimer Films. However, as of June 2018, the project remains in development hell.

References

External links

American male screenwriters
Living people
Year of birth missing (living people)